

Notable war correspondents

19th century
 Archibald Forbes
 Benjamin C. Truman
 Bennet Burleigh (1840–1914), Sudan (Omdurman), Boer War, Russo-Japanese War, Italo-Turkish war
 Charles Frederick Williams, British journalist.
 Ferdinando Petruccelli della Gattina, Expedition of the thousand, Second and Third Italian War of Independence, Paris Commune
 Frederic Villiers
 George Wingrove Cooke, Second Opium War, 1857–1858.
 Henry Crabb Robinson, Germany and Spain (1807–1809).
 Howard C. Hillegas, covered Boer Wars
 John F. Finerty was a war correspondent for the Chicago Times covering the Great Sioux War of 1876–1877.
 Kit Coleman  (1864–1915), female war correspondent who covered the Spanish–American War for the Toronto Mail in 1898.
 Peter Finnerty, Walcheren Campaign (1809).
 Richard Harding Davis (1864–1916); covered the Spanish–American War, Second Boer War and the fighting on the Macedonian front during World War I.
 Robert Edmund Strahorn was a fighting war correspondent in The Great Sioux War of 1876–1877.
 Stephen Crane (1871–1900); covered the 1897 Greco-Turkish War, where he contracted tuberculosis.
 Thomas William Bowlby, North China Campaign (1860).
 William Hicks covered the Battle of Trafalgar for The Times (1805)
 William Howard Russell covered The Crimean War (1854–1855)
 Winston Churchill (1874–1965); covered the Siege of Malakand, the Mahdist War and the Second Boer War.

20th century

Some of them became authors of fiction drawing on their war experiences, including Davis, Crane and Hemingway.

Aernout van Lynden
Al Gore (born 1948); covered the Vietnam War.
Alan Moorehead; Australian reporter, covered World War II with units of General Bernard Montgomery, author of several books on the war.
Albert K. Dawson (1885–1967); American photographer and film correspondent with the German, Austrian and Bulgarian army during World War I
Alexander Clifford; covered World War II
Alexander Gault MacGowan (1894–1970); correspondent for The Sun (New York), reported from the front lines in World War II.
Alexandra Boulat
Anderson Cooper (born 1967); war correspondent for CNN who covered Somalia, Bosnia, and Rwanda.
Anna Politkovskaya
Anne O'Hare McCormick
Basil Clarke (1879–1947); covered the fighting on the Western Front during WWI, living as a fugitive in Dunkirk during the early part of the War and then as an accredited reporter at the Battle of the Somme in late 1916. he also covered the Eastern Front and the Easter Rising and later became the UK's first public relations officer.
Bernard B. Fall; (1926–1967); covered the First Indochina War and the Vietnam War (where he was killed by a landmine).
Betty Knox (1906–1963); dancer with Wilson, Keppel and Betty and war correspondent for the London Evening Standard during WWII
Betty Wason
Bill Boss (1917–2007); Canadian war correspondent, for the Canadian Press, who covered World War II.
Bill Downs (1914–1978); one of the "Murrow Boys" who covered the Eastern Front, the Normandy landings, and later covered the Korean War.
Bill Shadel
Blaise Cendrars
Burton Crane (1901–1963); covered occupied Japan after World War II and the Korean War for The New York Times.
Catherine Leroy (1945–2006); French freelance photographer, covered the Vietnam War.
Cecil Brown
Charles Collingwood
Charles Shaw
Chas Gerretsen (born 1943); covered the war in Vietnam, Cambodia and Laos and received the Robert Capa Gold Medal Award for his coverage of the 1973 Chilean coup d'état
Chester Wilmot
Chris Hedges
Christopher Morris
Clair Kenamore, St. Louis Post-Dispatch, early 20th century
Clare Hollingworth; covered World War II, Algerian War, Vietnam War, Bangladesh Liberation War (1971).
Cork Graham (born 1964); imprisoned in Vietnam for illegally entering the country while looking for treasure buried by Captain Kidd.
Corra Harris; early women correspondent in World War I.
Curzio Malaparte
Dan Rather; Covered Vietnam War for CBS News for several months in 1966–67.
David Douglas Duncan
David Halberstam (1934–2007); American journalist, The New York Times. Covered the war in the Congo and the Vietnam War for which he won the Pulitzer Prize.
Derek Round (1935–2012); Covered the Vietnam War.
Dickey Chapelle (1918–1965); covered the Pacific War, the 1956 Hungarian Revolution and the Vietnam War (where she was killed by a landmine). She was the first female US war correspondent to be killed in action.
Don McCullin; British photographer. Covered conflicts in Northern Ireland, Vietnam, Biafra.
Edgar Rice Burroughs; WWII—covered the attack on Pearl Harbor. Became one of the oldest war correspondents ever.
Edward R. Murrow (1908–1965); Covered the Blitz in London and the European Theater during World War II for CBS News. Hired a team of foreign correspondents for CBS News who became known as the "Murrow Boys".
Edwin L. James (1890–1951); covered World War I for The New York Times
Ellis Ashmead-Bartlett (1881–1931); covered the Russo-Japanese War and World War I.
Eric Lloyd Williams
Eric Sevareid
Ernest Hemingway (1899–1961); covered the 1922 Catastrophe of Smyrna in Turkey, the Spanish Civil War and World War II.
Ernie Pyle; Scripps-Howard Newspapers, reported human interest stories from the front lines in World War II, Pulitzer Prize, 1944. Pyle was killed by a machine gun burst on the island of Iejima in April 1945, while covering ongoing conflict on the island.
Frank Hewlett (1913–1983); covered WW2 in the Philippines
Frank Palmos (1940–); Vietnam War 1965–1968, Indonesian Civil War 1965–66.
Gary Knight (born 1964); British photojournalist. Covered conflicts in: Yugoslavia, Iraq, Afghanistan war.
Gaston Chérau (Niort (France) 1872 - Boston (USA) 1937). French war correspondent and photograph for Le Matin during the Italo-Turkish war over Libya (1911-1912) and for L'Illustration at the beginning of World War I (1914-1915). See : Pierre Schill, Réveiller l’archive d’une guerre coloniale. Photographies et écrits de Gaston Chérau, correspondant de guerre lors du conflit italo-turc pour la Libye (1911-1912), Créaphis, 2018, 480p.et 230 photographies.
George Lewis (NBC News); covered Vietnam War 1970–1973
George Polk
George Sessions Perry (1910–1956); Writer who covered WWII for Harper's Weekly and the Saturday Evening Post. Accompanied troops on invasions of Italy and France. Said after the war that his war experiences "de-fictionalized" him for life and never wrote fiction again.
Georgie Anne Geyer (born 1935); covered the Guatemalan Civil War and the Algerian Civil War.
Gloria Emerson (1929–2004); covered the Vietnam War for The New York Times in 1970–72 and wrote the book Winners and Losers which won the National Book Award.
Greg Clarke (1892–1977); Canadian war correspondent who covered World War I and II.
Helen Kirkpatrick (1909–1997); covered World War II including The Blitz, Normandy Invasion and Liberation of France.
Henry Tilton Gorrell (1911–1958); United Press correspondent. Covered the Spanish Civil War and World War II. Author of "Soldier of the Press, Covering the Front in Europe and North Africa, 1936–1943" in 2009.
Horst Faas (1933–2012); Associated Press Saigon Photographer, two Pulitzer Prices, co author "Lost Over Laos", "Requiem", "Henri Huet". Covered the Congo War, Algeria, Vietnam, Bangladesh.
Howard K. Smith
J. C. Furnas; covered World War II.
Jack London
Jacques Leslie; Cambodian–Vietnamese War correspondent for the Los Angeles Times, 1972–1973, 1975. Leslie was the first American journalist to enter and return from Viet Cong (National Liberation Front) territory in South Vietnam, in January 1973.
James Nachtwey (born 1948); American photographer. Covered Northern Ireland, South Africa, Iraq, Sudan, Indonesia, India, Rwanda, Chechnya, Pakistan, Kosovo, Bosnia, Romania, Afghanistan, Israel.
Jean Leune (1889–1944); and Hélène Vitivilia Leune (?–1940), French war correspondents who as a married couple covered the First Balkan War in Greece 1912–1913.
Jessie Pope; was a pro war journalist and poet during the first world war.
Jim G. Lucas; Scripps-Howard Newspapers, reported human interest stories from the front lines in World War II, Korea and Vietnam.
Jim McGlincy (1917–1988); United Press correspondent, covered World War II in London and the postwar conflict in French Indochina.
Joe Sacco; comics artist who covered the Gulf War and Bosnian War
Johannes-Matthias Hönscheid; covered World War II, only correspondent to receive the Knight's Cross of the Iron Cross
John MacVane
John Pilger
John Reed (1887–1920); covered the Mexican Revolution, the First World War, and the Russian Revolution, author of Ten Days that Shook the World
John Rich (1917–2014); American journalist. Covered World War II, the Korean War, and the Vietnam War for NBC News.
John Steinbeck
Joseph Kessel
Joseph L. Galloway (born November 13, 1941); UPI correspondent in Vietnam and co-author of We Were Soldiers Once...and Young.
Joseph Morton (born in 1911 or 1913, died in 1945); Associated Press war correspondent, the first American correspondent to be executed by the enemy during World War II.
Karsten Thielker (born 1966); German photojournalist. Covered Rwanda Genocide, Kosovo. 1995 Pulitzer Prize.
Kate Adie (born 1945); covered the Gulf War, Yugoslav Wars, Rwandan genocide and the Sierra Leone Civil War.
Kate Webb (1943–2007); covered the Vietnam and Cambodian wars for UPI; captured by the North Vietnamese in Cambodia in 1971 and held for three weeks; covered East Timor war. Later Gulf War, Indonesia, Afghanistan for AFP.
Kurt Eggers (1905–1943); World War II SS correspondent, editor of the SS magazine Das Schwarze Korps, was killed while reporting on the Wiking's battles near Kharkov. The German SS-Standarte Kurt Eggers was named in his honor.
Kurt Schork
Larry Burrows (1927–1971); British photojournalist famous for his work in the Vietnam War. Killed in a helicopter crash over Laos with three colleagues.
Larry LeSueur; CBS radio correspondent, reported from rooftops during World War II London blitzes, went ashore in the first waves of the D-Day invasion, and broadcast to America the Allied liberation of Paris. One of the "Murrow Boys".
Lothar-Günther Buchheim (1918–2007); covered Kriegsmarine patrols during the World War II, most notably the famous  seventh patrol in the Battle of the Atlantic which was eventually taken as basis for the Oscar nominated movie and mini-series Das Boot ("The Boat").
Louis Grondijs (1878–1961); covered Russo-Japanese War, World War I, the Russian Civil War, the Japanese invasion of Manchuria and the Spanish Civil War.
Luc Delahaye
Macdonald Hastings
Margaret Bourke-White (1904–1971); first female war correspondent, photographed Buchenwald concentration camp
Marguerite Higgins; paved the way for female war correspondents.
Marie Colvin; considered one of the most influential correspondents of past 20 years, killed in Homs, Syria.
Martha Gellhorn (1908–1998); covered the Spanish Civil War, World War II, Vietnam War, the Six-Day War, and the U.S. invasion of Panama.
Martin Bell (born 1938); covered the Vietnam War, Biafra War, The Troubles in Northern Ireland, the Angolan Civil War and the Bosnian War.
Marvin Breckinridge Patterson (1905–2002); covered World War II.
Max Hastings
Michael Birch (1944–1968); killed in Saigon during Tet while covering the Vietnam War.
Michael Herr (1940–2016); American writer for Esquire in the Vietnam War (1967–68). Book: Dispatches, Screenplay: Full Metal Jacket Voice-over narration for Apocalypse Now.
Morley Safer; Covered Vietnam War for CBS News in 1965 and made documentary film, Morley Safer's Vietnam.
Nakayama Gishu
Neil Davis; Australian combat cameraman covered the Vietnam War, Cambodia and Laos and subsequently conflicts in Africa. He was killed in 1985 in Thailand.
Oriana Fallaci (1929-2006); Italian journalist, author and partisan. Covered the Vietnam War, Indo-Pakistani War, Middle East, and in South America.
Osmar White
Patrick Chauvel
Paul Wood; BBC defense correspondent in the Middle East covering the Arab World since 2003.
Peggy Hull (1889–1967); covered World War I and World War II
Peter Arnett (born 1934); covered the Vietnam War, 1991 Gulf War, the 2001 Invasion of Afghanistan and the 2003 Iraq War.
Peter Cave (born 1952); covered the Gulf War, Yugoslav Wars, the Coconut War in the New Hebrides, Iraq War, Tiananmen Square in Beijing, Lebanon, Egypt and Libya
Peter Scholl-Latour (1922–2014); German journalist who covered conflicts in Africa and Asia, Algeria, Vietnam, Angola, Israel, Iraq, Iran, Cambodia, etc. Author of 30 books.
Philip Gibbs; Official war Correspondent for Britain during World War I.
Philip Jones Griffiths (1936–2008); British photojournalist who covered the Vietnam War.
Ralph Barnes (1899–1940); the first war correspondent killed during World War II
Ralph Morse; (born 1917) covered World War II
Richard C. Hottelet
Richard Dimbleby (1913–1965); covered World War II
Richard Tregaskis; author of Guadalcanal Diary, dramatized in movie of same name.
Robert Capa (1913–1954); covered the Spanish Civil War, Second Sino-Japanese War, the European Theatre of World War II and the First Indochina War (where he was killed by a landmine).
Robert Goralski; NBC News correspondent. Covered the Vietnam War; provided witness testimony in the My Lai massacre trials.
Robert Pierpoint
Robert Sherrod;  World War II, Pacific theatre, Guadalcanal and Tarawa/Saipan
Ron Haviv
Roy Pinney (1911–2010); covered World War II and was present at the Normandy landing on D-Day for the Normandy Invasion. He also covered the Yom Kippur War in the Gaza Strip and conflicts in Afghanistan, the Philippines, South Africa and Colombia.
Ruth Cowan Nash (1943-1945); First American woman war correspondent. Covered Women's Army Auxiliary Corps and their first deployment in Algeria.
Sigrid Schultz
Simon Dring; British correspondent for Reuters, London Daily Telegraph, BBC-TV News; covered wars/revolutions in Laos, Vietnam, Cambodia, Biafra, Cyprus, Angola, Eritrea, India-Pakistan, Bangladesh, Iran, Bosnia, Middle East.
Steve McCurry (born 1950); American photographer. Covered Cambodian Civil War, Afghanistan, Pakistan, Lebanon, Gulf War. Member of Magnum Photos.
Sydney Schanberg; his experiences in Cambodia during the Vietnam War are dramatized in The Killing Fields
Sylvana Foa; correspondent in Vietnam and Cambodia.
Tom Lea (1907–2001); Life painter and correspondent in both the European and Pacific theaters with the US Navy and the US 1st Marine Division.
Tim Judah (born 1962); covered El Salvador, Romanian Revolution, Yugoslavia, Croatia, Bosnia, Kosovo, Afghanistan, Darfur, Iraq, Ukraine.
Tom Grandin
Vassili Grossman
Vaughan Smith (born 1963); British cameraman, covered Afghanistan, Iraq, Bosnia, Chechnya, Kosova, Gulf War.
Vern Haugland (1908–1984); Associated Press, World War II Pacific theater, first civilian awarded Silver Star medal
Vicente Huidobro covered World War II in Europe.
Waldemar Milewicz
Walter Cronkite (1916–2009); covered the European Theater during World War II for United Press.
Wilfred Burchett (1911–1983); covered the Pacific War, Korean War and Vietnam War.
William L. Shirer; Covered WWII for CBS News, one of the "Murrow Boys", and the author of "The Rise and Fall of the Third Reich", a scholarly history.
William Pidgeon (1909-1981) artist and writer, principally for The Australian Women's Weekly.  He visited Darwin, Northern Territory, Papua New Guinea, Morotai and Borneo in World War II
Winston Burdett

21st century
 Martin Adler (1958–2006) Swedish video journalist, killed in Mogadishu, Somalia. Covered the Gulf War, Liberia, Rwanda, Sierra Leone.
 Christiane Amanpour covered the Gulf War and the Bosnian War
 Jon Lee Anderson covered the wars in Afghanistan, Iraq, Uganda, Israel, El Salvador, Ireland, Lebanon and Iran.
 Andrew Beatty, embedded for AFP during the 2011 Libyan Civil War and fired upon during the 2012 Benghazi attack
 Ben Brown covered the Gulf War
 Mile Cărpenişan (born August 23, 1975 – died March 22, 2010) covered the Iraq War and Kosovo war
 Mstyslav Chernov (Associated Press), covered the War in Donbass, Syrian civil war, and US military operations in Iraq.
 Marie Colvin (1956–2012) American UPI after Sunday Times journalist. Covering the conflict in Syria, Marie was killed in Homs. Covered conflicts in Sierra Leone, Chechnya, Sri Lanka, Libya
 Dan Eldon (1970–1993) British photojournalist. Killed in Mogadishu, Somalia, by an angry mob while covering the Battle of Mogadishu
 Richard Engel (born 1973), American who covered the Iraq War, the 2006 Lebanon War and the Syrian civil war (during which he was kidnapped but subsequently rescued)
 Dexter Filkins (born 1961), covered wars in Iraq, Afghanistan, and Syrian
 Robert Fisk (1946–2020), British journalist, covered Northern Ireland conflict, Algerian Civil War, Beirut, Bosnia, Afghanistan, Lebanese Civil War, Iranian Revolution, Iran–Iraq War, the 1991 Persian Gulf War, Kosovo War and the 2003 Iraq War.
 Janine di Giovanni (1990–present) reported wars in Bosnia, Africa, the Middle East and, more recently, Syria.
 Aziz Ullah Haidari (1968 – November 19, 2001); covered the Afghanistan war
 Michael Hastings (1980–2013) covered the Iraq War and the Afghanistan War
 Tim Hetherington (1970–2011) British Photographer and documentary filmmaker, covered Afghanistan, Liberia and was killed in Libya.
 Chris Hondros (1970–2011) American photographer, covered conflicts in Liberia, Angola, Sierra Leone, Kosovo and was killed in Misrata, Libya, in 2011.
 Wojciech Jagielski
 Gilles Jacquier (1968–2012) French cameraman for France 2 Television. He was the first reporter killed in Syrian civil war.
 Sebastian Junger, American Journalist and documentary filmmaker, covered conflicts in Bosnia and Afghanistan
 Ryszard Kapuściński
 Joseph Kessel
 Rick Leventhal (born 1960) covered the wars in Kosovo, Afghanistan, Iraq and Libya
 Terry Lloyd (1952–2003), British television journalist, covered the Middle East. He was killed by U.S. troops while covering the 2003 invasion of Iraq for ITN.
 Anthony Loyd (born 1966) covered Bosnia and Chechnya
 Karen Maron
 Kenji Nagai (1957–2007) Japanese photographer. Covered Afghanistan War. Kenji was killed in Yangon, Burma.
 Remy Ourdan
 Iain Overton, who has written two books on conflict.
 Robert Young Pelton, best known for his 1,000+ page guide to warzones and survival, The World's Most Dangerous Places.
 Arturo Pérez-Reverte, worked for Pueblo newspaper and Spanish TVE. Covered the Bosnian War among others
 Nir Rosen; covered the Iraq War and the War in Afghanistan
 İrfan Sapmaz (born 1962) Turkish senior war correspondent; covered the Soviet–Afghan War from 1987 for six years onwards, as well as the Gulf Wars and more-recent conflicts in the Middle East for CNN Türk.
 Giuliana Sgrena
 Anthony Shadid (1968-2012) covered Iraq war, Arab spring. Pulitzer Prize for International Reporting 2004 & 2009.
 Heba Shibani
 John Simpson
 Kevin Sites
 Daniel Wakefield Smith
 Michael Ware (born 1969); ongoing coverage of the invasion and occupation of Iraq. Reporting from the perspectives of all combatant groups.
 Olivier Weber covered the Iraq War, the War in Afghanistan, in Israel, Iran, Eritrea, Algeria, Pakistan and a dozen other conflicts.
 Mika Yamamoto (1967–2012) Japanese photographer and TV journalist. Killed on August 20, 2012, in Aleppo, while covering the Syrian civil war
 Isobel Yeung Covered conflicts in Yemen, Syria, Philippines.
 Michael Yon (born 1964); former Green Beret, turned journalist and author. Embedded with American, British and Lithuanian combat units in Iraq War
 Hollie McKay (born 1985) covered conflicts in Iraq, Afghanistan, Syria, Yemen, Mynamnar, and Ukraine.

See also
List of World War II war correspondents (1942–43)
List of military attachés and war correspondents in World War I

References

War correspondents
Lists of journalists